Battletoads is a media franchise.

It may also refer to:

Battletoads (characters)
Battletoads (1991 video game)
Battletoads (2020 video game)
Battletoads (Game Boy video game)
Battletoads Arcade